Events in the year 2003 in Portugal.

Incumbents
President: Jorge Sampaio
Prime Minister: José Manuel Barroso

Events

Arts and entertainment
International Sand Sculpture Festival established; held annually in Pêra, Algarve

Sports
20 January to 2 February – The 2003 World Men's Handball Championship took place in Portugal
Football (soccer) competitions: Primeira Liga, Liga de Honra

Births

Deaths

10 July – Manuel Vasques, football player (born 1926).
30 November – António Jesus Correia, football player (born 1924)

Full date missing
Manuel Pereira da Silva, sculptor (born 1920)

See also
List of Portuguese films of 2003

References

 
2000s in Portugal
Portugal
Years of the 21st century in Portugal
Portugal